was a Japanese samurai and commander of the Sengoku period. Nobunao an Kumagai clan's ancestor was Kumagai Naozane. He initially served the Aki Takeda clan, but he left Takeda clan and became a vassal of the Mōri Motonari. He moved Kumagai clan's main bastion from Isegatsubo Castle to Miiri-Takamatsu Castle.

In 1547, His daughter was married to Motonari's son Kikkawa Motoharu. Thus, Kumagai clan became an important servant of the Mōri clan.

References

Samurai
1507 births
1593 deaths
Mōri clan